The mazhar (plural mazāhar, مزاهر) is a large, heavy tambourine used in Arabic music. The mazhar's frame is generally made out of wood. Its single head is considerably thicker than that of the riq, its smaller cousin. Some drums have brass zills that are about 10–13 centimetres (4–5 inches) in diameter; these may be played with a shaking technique.

The Egyptian percussionist Hossam Ramzy is a notable performer of the mazhar.

See also

External links
Mazhar page from N. Scott Robinson site
Mazhar page from OnestopIsraelShop

Asian percussion instruments
Hand drums
Arabic musical instruments